Terence Butler may refer to:
 Geezer Butler (born Terence Butler 1949), English bassist of the band Black Sabbath
 Terry Butler (born 1967), American bassist of the band Six Feet Under
 Terry Butler (rugby league) (1958–2016), Australian rugby league footballer